Boulogne most commonly refers to Boulogne-sur-Mer, a city in northern France by the English Channel.

"Boulogne" may also refer to:

Places and geography

Argentina
 Boulogne Sur Mer, a town in Buenos Aires Province

France
 Boulogne (river), a river in western France
 Boulogne, Vendée, a former commune in western France now part of Essarts-en-Bocage
 Boulogne-Billancourt, a commune near Paris
 Bois de Boulogne, a park in Paris bordering Boulogne-Billancourt
 County of Boulogne, an historic county centered on Boulogne-sur-Mer
 Boulogne-sur-Mer, a French coastal city.

United States
 Boulogne, a small town in Florida

People with the surname
 Joseph Boulogne (Chevalier de Saint-Georges), French classical composer, swordsman and equestrian
 Valentin de Boulogne, French painter

Other
 US Boulogne, a French football team in Boulogne-sur-Mer

See also
Boullogne, a French surname
Bononia (disambiguation)
Bologna (disambiguation)